North Korea competed as the Democratic People's Republic of Korea at the 1972 Summer Olympics in Munich, West Germany. It was the first time that the nation had competed at the Summer Olympic Games. 37 competitors, 23 men and 14 women, took part in 23 events in 10 sports. North Korea won the first Olympic gold medal from either Korea.

Medalists

Archery

Athletics

Boxing

Gymnastics

Judo

Rowing

Shooting

Three male shooters represented North Korea in 1972. Ri Ho-jun won gold in the 50 m rifle, prone event.

300 m rifle, three positions
 Li Yun-hae
 Ri Ho-jun

50 m rifle, three positions
 Ri Ho-jun
 Li Yun-hae

50 m rifle, prone
 Ri Ho-jun
 Li Yun-hae

50 m running target
 Kim Song-bok

Volleyball

Weightlifting

Wrestling

References

External links
Official Olympic Reports
International Olympic Committee results database

Korea, North
1972
1972 in North Korean sport